Tomandandy is an American musical duo from New York City, consisting of members Thomas Hajdu and Andy Milburn. While they are best known for their work scoring films, their portfolio includes music for television commercials as well as television programs, records and art installations.

History
Andy Milburn was born in Texas and went to Princeton University for undergraduate as well as graduate work. At Princeton, his primary focus was creating computer music and computer music applications. During that time, he contributed to the early computer music system called Real-time Cmix. Thomas Hajdu was born in Canada and moved to the US to work on his graduate studies at Princeton University. Tom has sat on many award juries and chaired and spoken at international conferences about the impact of technology on content including TED, MIT Enterprise Forum and Digital Hollywood.

Milburn and Hajdu moved to New York after Princeton and started collaborating with film director Mark Pellington at MTV and film editors Hank Corwin and Bruce Ashley in the UK. Soon their work was being used in commercials, TV shows, feature films, art installations and record projects. Tomandandy quickly grew and they built a number of recording studios in New York and later in Los Angeles.  At the same time, Tomandandy invested in technological innovations focusing on digital entertainment.  A notable project was the MTV "Buzz" series.

In 1992, Tomandandy appeared on the Red Hot Organization's dance compilation album, Red Hot + Dance, contributing an original dance track, "Theme From Red Hot & Dance (Gothic Mix)."  The album attempted to raise awareness and money in support of the AIDS epidemic, and all proceeds were donated to AIDS charities.

In 2009, Tomandandy won Best Horror Score (runner-up) in Fangoria's Chainsaw Award for their score to The Strangers.

In 2020, Tomandandy's Tom Hajdu reflected on The Strangers soundtrack during an interview. "There was a lot of intentionality in mixing strange sounds with familiar sounds! It was a combination of analog, synthetic, and ambient sounds, along with silence, put together in unusual ways. To create combinations that are not necessarily traditional in that respect, or expected." - Tom Hajdu

Selected discography

Other works
 Zoo TV: Live from Sydney (1994)
 "You'll Know You Were Loved" - Lou Reed from Friends Original TV Soundtrack - Reprise, 1995
 "In Our Sleep" - Laurie Anderson - Warner Bros., 1995
 "Cartridgemusic" from Offbeat: A Red Hot Soundtrip - TVT, 1996
 "It Goes Back" - David Byrne from Offbeat: A Red Hot Soundtrip - TVT, 1996
 United States of Poetry - PolyGram, 1996
 "Old Western Movies" - collaboration with William S. Burroughs from Kerouac: Kicks Joy Darkness - Ryko, 1997
 Family Tools (2013) (TV series theme)

Film scores

Selected artistic collaborations
 No Maps for These Territories, documentary collaboration with author William Gibson and director Mark Neale, Slamdance, 2001
 Starn Brothers, Black Sun Burned, Leo Castelli Gallery, New York, 1998
 Tom Sachs, Sony Outsider, Thomas Healy Gallery, New York, 1998
 David Byrne, Grammy/Academy Award winner, production and composition for It Goes Back from Offbeat, TVT Records, 1997
 Lou Reed, Grammy Award winner, production and composition for You Know You Were Loved from Friends soundtrack, Reprise/Warner, 1997
 William S. Burroughs, Academy and Institute of Arts and Letters novelist, production and composition for Old Western Movies from Kicks Joy Darkness. Ryko, 1997
 Remix of the Gravity Kills song "Goodbye" on the Guilty remix single. TVT Records, 1996
 La Fura dels Baus, John Paul Jones, Peter Gabriel, collaboration for Spanish World's Fair, 1996
 Laurie Anderson, Creator of Performance Art, production and composition for In Our Sleep, Warner Brothers, 1995
 U2: Zoo TV, World Tour, 1994
 Oliver Stone, Academy Award-winning writer/director, additional music for feature films JFK, Warner Brothers 1991 and Natural Born Killers'', Warner Brothers 1994
 Jenny Holzer, Laments, DiaArt Foundation, New York, 1989

References

External links
 Official website
 
 Official MySpace
 Tomandandy Spotify

American experimental musical groups
American film score composers
American male film score composers
American trance musicians
Musical groups from New York City
Living people
Year of birth missing (living people)